Character encoding is the process of assigning numbers to graphical characters, especially the written characters of human language, allowing them to be stored, transmitted, and transformed using digital computers. The numerical values that make up a character encoding are known as "code points" and collectively comprise a "code space", a "code page", or a "character map".

Early character codes associated with the optical or electrical telegraph could only represent a subset of the characters used in written languages, sometimes restricted to upper case letters, numerals and some punctuation only. The low cost of digital representation of data in modern computer systems allows more elaborate character codes (such as Unicode) which represent most of the characters used in many written languages. Character encoding using internationally accepted standards permits worldwide interchange of text in electronic form.

History 
The history of character codes illustrates the evolving need for machine-mediated character-based symbolic information over a distance, using once-novel electrical means. The earliest codes were based upon manual and hand-written encoding and cyphering systems, such as Bacon's cipher, Braille, International maritime signal flags, and the 4-digit encoding of Chinese characters for a Chinese telegraph code (Hans Schjellerup, 1869). With the adoption of electrical and electro-mechanical techniques these earliest codes were adapted to the new capabilities and limitations of the early machines. The earliest well-known electrically transmitted character code, Morse code, introduced in the 1840s, used a system of four "symbols" (short signal, long signal, short space, long space) to generate codes of variable length. Though some commercial use of Morse code was via machinery, it was often used as a manual code, generated by hand on a telegraph key and decipherable by ear, and persists in amateur radio and aeronautical use.  Most codes are of fixed per-character length or variable-length sequences of fixed-length codes (e.g. Unicode).

Common examples of character encoding systems include Morse code, the Baudot code, the American Standard Code for Information Interchange (ASCII) and Unicode. Unicode, a well defined and extensible encoding system, has supplanted most earlier character encodings, but the path of code development to the present is fairly well known.

The Baudot code, a five-bit encoding, was created by Émile Baudot in 1870, patented in 1874, modified by Donald Murray in 1901, and standardized by CCITT as International Telegraph Alphabet No. 2 (ITA2) in 1930. The name "baudot" has been erroneously applied to ITA2 and its many variants. ITA2 suffered from many shortcomings and was often "improved" by many equipment manufacturers, sometimes creating compatibility issues. In 1959 the U.S. military defined its Fieldata code, a six-or seven-bit code, introduced by the U.S. Army Signal Corps. While Fieldata addressed many of the then-modern issues (e.g. letter and digit codes arranged for machine collation), Fieldata fell short of its goals and was short-lived. In 1963 the first ASCII (American Standard Code for Information Interchange) code was released (X3.4-1963) by the ASCII committee (which contained at least one member of the Fieldata committee, W. F. Leubbert) which addressed most of the shortcomings of Fieldata, using a simpler code. Many of the changes were subtle, such as collatable character sets within certain numeric ranges. ASCII63 was a success, widely adopted by industry, and with the follow-up issue of the 1967 ASCII code (which added lower-case letters and fixed some "control code" issues) ASCII67 was adopted fairly widely. ASCII67's American-centric nature was somewhat addressed in the European ECMA-6 standard.

Herman Hollerith invented punch card data encoding in the late 19th century to analyze census data. Initially, each hole position represented a different data element, but later, numeric information was encoded by numbering the lower rows 0 to 9, with a punch in a column representing its row number. Later alphabetic data was encoded by allowing more than one punch per column. Electromechanical tabulating machines represented date internally by the timing of pulses relative to the motion of the cards through the machine. When IBM went to electronic processing, starting with the IBM 603 Electronic Multiplier, it used a variety of binary encoding schemes that were tied to the punch card code.

IBM's Binary Coded Decimal (BCD) was a six-bit encoding scheme used by IBM as early as 1953 in its 702 and 704 computers, and in its later 7000 Series and 1400 series, as well as in associated peripherals. Since the punched card code then in use only allowed digits, upper-case English letters and a few special characters, six bits were sufficient. BCD extended existing simple four-bit numeric encoding to include alphabetic and special characters, mapping it easily to punch-card encoding which was already in widespread use. IBMs codes were used primarily with IBM equipment; other computer vendors of the era had their own character codes, often six-bit, but usually had the ability to read tapes produced on IBM equipment. BCD was the precursor of IBM's Extended Binary Coded Decimal Interchange Code (usually abbreviated as EBCDIC), an eight-bit encoding scheme developed in 1963 for the IBM System/360 that featured a larger character set, including lower case letters.

The limitations of such sets soon became apparent, and a number of ad hoc methods were developed to extend them. The need to support more writing systems for different languages, including the CJK family of East Asian scripts, required support for a far larger number of characters and demanded a systematic approach to character encoding rather than the previous ad hoc approaches.

In trying to develop universally interchangeable character encodings, researchers in the 1980s faced the dilemma that, on the one hand, it seemed necessary to add more bits to accommodate additional characters, but on the other hand, for the users of the relatively small character set of the Latin alphabet (who still constituted the majority of computer users), those additional bits were a colossal waste of then-scarce and expensive computing resources (as they would always be zeroed out for such users).  In 1985, the average personal computer user's hard disk drive could store only about 10 megabytes, and it cost approximately US$250 on the wholesale market (and much higher if purchased separately at retail), so it was very important at the time to make every bit count.

The compromise solution that was eventually found and developed into Unicode was to break the assumption (dating back to telegraph codes) that each character should always directly correspond to a particular sequence of bits. Instead, characters would first be mapped to a universal intermediate representation in the form of abstract numbers called code points. Code points would then be represented in a variety of ways and with various default numbers of bits per character (code units) depending on context. To encode code points higher than the length of the code unit, such as above 256 for eight-bit units, the solution was to implement variable-length encodings where an escape sequence would signal that subsequent bits should be parsed as a higher code point.

Terminology 
 Terminology related to character encoding

 A character is a minimal unit of text that has semantic value.
 A character set is a collection of characters that might be used by multiple languages. Example: The Latin character set is used by English and most European languages, though the Greek character set is used only by the Greek language.
 A coded character set is a character set in which each character corresponds to a unique number.
 A code point of a coded character set is any allowed value in the character set or code space.
 A code space is a range of integers whose values are code points.
 A code unit is the "word size" of the character encoding scheme, such as 7-bit, 8-bit, 16-bit. In some schemes, some characters are encoded using multiple code units, resulting in a variable-length encoding. A code unit is referred to as a code value in some documents.

 Character repertoire (the abstract set of characters)

The character repertoire is an abstract set of more than one million characters found in a wide variety of scripts including Latin, Cyrillic, Chinese, Korean, Japanese, Hebrew, and Aramaic.

Other symbols such as musical notation are also included in the character repertoire. Both the Unicode and GB 18030 standards have a character repertoire. As new characters are added to one standard, the other standard also adds those characters, to maintain parity.

The code unit size is equivalent to the bit measurement for the particular encoding:
 A code unit in US-ASCII consists of 7 bits;
 A code unit in UTF-8, EBCDIC and GB 18030 consists of 8 bits;
 A code unit in UTF-16 consists of 16 bits;
 A code unit in UTF-32 consists of 32 bits.

 Example of a code unit
Consider a string of the letters "ab̲c𐐀", that is, a string containing a Unicode combining character as well a supplementary character. This string has several representions which are logically equivalent, yet while each is suited to a diverse set of circumstances or range of requirements:
 Four composed characters:
 Five graphemes:
 Five Unicode code points:
 Five UTF-32 code units (32-bit integer values):
 Six UTF-16 code units (16-bit integers)
 Nine UTF-8 code units (8-bit values, or bytes)

Note in particular the last character, which is represented with either one 1 32-bit value, 2 16-bit values. or 4 8-bit values. Although each of those forms uses the same total number of bits (32) to represent the glyph, the actual numeric byte values and their arrangement appear entirely unrelated.

 Code point
The convention to refer to a character in Unicode is to start with 'U+' followed by the codepoint value in hexadecimal. The range of valid code points for the Unicode standard is U+0000 to U+10FFFF, inclusive, divided in 17 planes, identified by the numbers 0 to 16. Characters in the range U+0000 to U+FFFF are in plane 0, called the Basic Multilingual Plane (BMP). This plane contains most commonly-used characters. Characters in the range U+10000 to U+10FFFF in the other planes are called supplementary characters.

The following table shows examples of code point values:

A code point is represented by a sequence of code units. The mapping is defined by the encoding. Thus, the number of code units required to represent a code point depends on the encoding:
 UTF-8: code points map to a sequence of one, two, three or four code units.
 UTF-16: code units are twice as long as 8-bit code units. Therefore, any code point with a scalar value less than U+10000 is encoded with a single code unit. Code points with a value U+10000 or higher require two code units each. These pairs of code units have a unique term in UTF-16: "Unicode surrogate pairs".
 UTF-32: the 32-bit code unit is large enough that every code point is represented as a single code unit.
 GB 18030: multiple code units per code point are common, because of the small code units. Code points are mapped to one, two, or four code units.

Unicode encoding model 
Unicode and its parallel standard, the ISO/IEC 10646 Universal Character Set, together constitute a modern, unified character encoding. Rather than mapping characters directly to octets (bytes), they separately define what characters are available, corresponding natural numbers (code points), how those numbers are encoded as a series of fixed-size natural numbers (code units), and finally how those units are encoded as a stream of octets. The purpose of this decomposition is to establish a universal set of characters that can be encoded in a variety of ways. To describe this model correctly requires more precise terms than "character set" and "character encoding." The terms used in the modern model follow:

A character repertoire is the full set of abstract characters that a system supports. The repertoire may be closed, i.e. no additions are allowed without creating a new standard (as is the case with ASCII and most of the ISO-8859 series), or it may be open, allowing additions (as is the case with Unicode and to a limited extent the Windows code pages). The characters in a given repertoire reflect decisions that have been made about how to divide writing systems into basic information units. The basic variants of the Latin, Greek and Cyrillic alphabets can be broken down into letters, digits, punctuation, and a few special characters such as the space, which can all be arranged in simple linear sequences that are displayed in the same order they are read. But even with these alphabets, diacritics pose a complication: they can be regarded either as part of a single character containing a letter and diacritic (known as a precomposed character), or as separate characters. The former allows a far simpler text handling system but the latter allows any letter/diacritic combination to be used in text. Ligatures pose similar problems. Other writing systems, such as Arabic and Hebrew, are represented with more complex character repertoires due to the need to accommodate things like bidirectional text and glyphs that are joined in different ways for different situations.

A coded character set (CCS) is a function that maps characters to code points (each code point represents one character). For example, in a given repertoire, the capital letter "A" in the Latin alphabet might be represented by the code point 65, the character "B" to 66, and so on. Multiple coded character sets may share the same repertoire; for example ISO/IEC 8859-1 and IBM code pages 037 and 500 all cover the same repertoire but map them to different code points.

A character encoding form (CEF) is the mapping of code points to code units to facilitate storage in a system that represents numbers as bit sequences of fixed length (i.e. practically any computer system). For example, a system that stores numeric information in 16-bit units can only directly represent code points 0 to 65,535 in each unit, but larger code points (say, 65,536 to 1.4 million) could be represented by using multiple 16-bit units. This correspondence is defined by a CEF.

Next, a character encoding scheme (CES) is the mapping of code units to a sequence of octets to facilitate storage on an octet-based file system or transmission over an octet-based network. Simple character encoding schemes include UTF-8, UTF-16BE, UTF-32BE, UTF-16LE or UTF-32LE; compound character encoding schemes, such as UTF-16, UTF-32 and ISO/IEC 2022, switch between several simple schemes by using a byte order mark or escape sequences; compressing schemes try to minimize the number of bytes used per code unit (such as SCSU, BOCU, and Punycode).

Although UTF-32BE is a simpler CES, most systems working with Unicode use either UTF-8, which is backward compatible with fixed-length ASCII and maps Unicode code points to variable-length sequences of octets, or UTF-16BE, which is backward compatible with fixed-length UCS-2BE and maps Unicode code points to variable-length sequences of 16-bit words. See comparison of Unicode encodings for a detailed discussion.

Finally, there may be a higher-level protocol which supplies additional information to select the particular variant of a Unicode character, particularly where there are regional variants that have been 'unified' in Unicode as the same character. An example is the XML attribute xml:lang.

The Unicode model uses the term character map for historical systems which directly assign a sequence of characters to a sequence of bytes, covering all of CCS, CEF and CES layers.

Character sets, character maps and code pages 
Historically, the terms "character encoding", "character map", "character set" and "code page" were synonymous in computer science, as the same standard would specify a repertoire of characters and how they were to be encoded into a stream of code units – usually with a single character per code unit. But now the terms have related but distinct meanings, due to efforts by standards bodies to use precise terminology when writing about and unifying many different encoding systems. Regardless, the terms are still used interchangeably, with character set being nearly ubiquitous.

A "code page" usually means a byte-oriented encoding, but with regard to some suite of encodings (covering different scripts), where many characters share the same codes in most or all those code pages. Well-known code page suites are "Windows" (based on Windows-1252) and "IBM"/"DOS" (based on code page 437), see Windows code page for details. Most, but not all, encodings referred to as code pages are single-byte encodings (but see octet on byte size.)

IBM's Character Data Representation Architecture (CDRA) designates entities with coded character set identifiers (CCSIDs), each of which is variously called a "charset", "character set", "code page", or "CHARMAP".

The term "code page" does not occur in Unix or Linux where "charmap" is preferred, usually in the larger context of locales.

In contrast to a "coded character set", a "character encoding" is a map from abstract characters to code words. A "character set" in HTTP (and MIME) parlance is the same as a character encoding (but not the same as CCS).

"Legacy encoding" is a term sometimes used to characterize old character encodings, but with an ambiguity of sense. Most of its use is in the context of Unicodification, where it refers to encodings that fail to cover all Unicode code points, or, more generally, using a somewhat different character repertoire: several code points representing one Unicode character, or versa (see e.g. code page 437). Some sources refer to an encoding as legacy only because it preceded Unicode. All Windows code pages are usually referred to as legacy, both because they antedate Unicode and because they are unable to represent all 221 possible Unicode code points.

Character encoding translation 
As a result of having many character encoding methods in use (and the need for backward compatibility with archived data), many computer programs have been developed to translate data between encoding schemes as a form of data transcoding. Some of these are cited below.

Cross-platform:
 Web browsers – most modern web browsers feature automatic character encoding detection. On Firefox 3, for example, see the View/Character Encoding submenu.
 iconv – a program and standardized API to convert encodings
 luit – a program that converts encoding of input and output to programs running interactively
 convert_encoding.py – a Python-based utility to convert text files between arbitrary encodings and line endings
 decodeh.py – an algorithm and module to heuristically guess the encoding of a string
 International Components for Unicode – A set of C and Java libraries to perform charset conversion. uconv can be used from ICU4C.
 chardet – This is a translation of the Mozilla automatic-encoding-detection code into the Python computer language.
 The newer versions of the Unix file command attempt to do a basic detection of character encoding (also available on Cygwin).
 charset – C++ template library with simple interface to convert between C++/user-defined streams. charset defined many character-sets and allows you to use Unicode formats with support of endianness.
Unix-like: 
 cmv – a simple tool for transcoding filenames.
 convmv – converts a filename from one encoding to another.
 cstocs – converts file contents from one encoding to another for the Czech and Slovak languages.
 enca – analyzes encodings for given text files.
 recode – converts file contents from one encoding to another.
 utrac – converts file contents from one encoding to another.

Windows:
 Encoding.Convert – .NET API
 MultiByteToWideChar/WideCharToMultiByte – to convert from ANSI to Unicode & Unicode to ANSI
 cscvt – a character set conversion tool
 enca – analyzes encodings for given text files.

See also 
 Percent-encoding
 Alt code
 Character encodings in HTML
 :Category:Character encoding – articles related to character encoding in general
 :Category:Character sets – articles detailing specific character encodings
 Hexadecimal representations
 Mojibake – character set mismap
 Mojikyō – a system ("glyph set") that includes over 100,000 Chinese character drawings, modern and ancient, popular and obscure
 Presentation layer
 TRON, part of the TRON project, is an encoding system that does not use Han Unification; instead, it uses "control codes" to switch between 16-bit "planes" of characters.
 Universal Character Set characters
 Charset sniffing – used in some applications when character encoding metadata is not available

Common character encodings 

 ISO 646
 ASCII
 EBCDIC
 ISO 8859:
 ISO 8859-1 Western Europe
 ISO 8859-2 Western and Central Europe
 ISO 8859-3 Western Europe and South European (Turkish, Maltese plus Esperanto)
 ISO 8859-4 Western Europe and Baltic countries (Lithuania, Estonia, Latvia and Lapp)
 ISO 8859-5 Cyrillic alphabet
 ISO 8859-6 Arabic
 ISO 8859-7 Greek
 ISO 8859-8 Hebrew
 ISO 8859-9 Western Europe with amended Turkish character set
 ISO 8859-10 Western Europe with rationalised character set for Nordic languages, including complete Icelandic set
 ISO 8859-11 Thai
 ISO 8859-13 Baltic languages plus Polish
 ISO 8859-14 Celtic languages (Irish Gaelic, Scottish, Welsh)
 ISO 8859-15 Added the Euro sign and other rationalisations to ISO 8859-1
 ISO 8859-16 Central, Eastern and Southern European languages (Albanian, Bosnian, Croatian, Hungarian, Polish, Romanian, Serbian and Slovenian, but also French, German, Italian and Irish Gaelic)
 CP437, CP720, CP737, CP850, CP852, CP855, CP857, CP858, CP860, CP861, CP862, CP863, CP865, CP866, CP869, CP872
 MS-Windows character sets:
 Windows-1250 for Central European languages that use Latin script, (Polish, Czech, Slovak, Hungarian, Slovene, Serbian, Croatian, Bosnian, Romanian and Albanian)
 Windows-1251 for Cyrillic alphabets
 Windows-1252 for Western languages
 Windows-1253 for Greek
 Windows-1254 for Turkish
 Windows-1255 for Hebrew
 Windows-1256 for Arabic
 Windows-1257 for Baltic languages
 Windows-1258 for Vietnamese
 Mac OS Roman
 KOI8-R, KOI8-U, KOI7
 MIK
 ISCII
 TSCII
 VISCII
 JIS X 0208 is a widely deployed standard for Japanese character encoding that has several encoding forms.
 Shift JIS (Microsoft Code page 932 is a dialect of Shift_JIS)
 EUC-JP
 ISO-2022-JP
 JIS X 0213 is an extended version of JIS X 0208.
 Shift_JIS-2004
 EUC-JIS-2004
 ISO-2022-JP-2004
 Chinese Guobiao
 GB 2312
 GBK (Microsoft Code page 936)
 GB 18030
 Taiwan Big5 (a more famous variant is Microsoft Code page 950)
 Hong Kong HKSCS
 Korean
 KS X 1001 is a Korean double-byte character encoding standard
 EUC-KR
 ISO-2022-KR
 Unicode (and subsets thereof, such as the 16-bit 'Basic Multilingual Plane')
 UTF-8
 UTF-16
 UTF-32
 ANSEL or ISO/IEC 6937

References

Further reading

External links 

Character sets registered by Internet Assigned Numbers Authority (IANA)
Characters and encodings, by Jukka Korpela
Unicode Technical Report #17: Character Encoding Model
Decimal, Hexadecimal Character Codes in HTML Unicode – Encoding converter
The Absolute Minimum Every Software Developer Absolutely, Positively Must Know About Unicode and Character Sets (No Excuses!) by Joel Spolsky (Oct 10, 2003)

 
Encoding